The 2020 Louth Senior Football Championship was the 127th edition of the Louth GAA's premier club Gaelic football tournament for senior graded teams in County Louth, Ireland. The tournament consisted of 12 teams, with the winner going on to represent Louth in the Leinster Senior Club Football Championship. The championship started with a group stage and then progressed to a knock out stage. In spite of the COVID-19 pandemic, there was no changes made to the format of the championship.

Newtown Blues were the defending champions for the third year in a row after they defeated the Naomh Máirtín in the previous years final. 

This was Mattock Rangers' return to the senior grade after at 4 year absence (they were relegated from the S.F.C. to the I.F.C. back in 2015) when claiming the 2019 Louth Intermediate Football Championship title with a final victory over Kilkerley Emmets.

Team changes
The following teams changed division since the 2019 championship season.

To S.F.C.
Promoted from 2019 Louth I.F.C.
 Mattock Rangers  -  (Intermediate Champions)

From S.F.C.
Relegated to 2020 Louth I.F.C.
 Seán O'Mahony's

Group stage
There are 4 groups called Group A, B, C and D. The top two finishers in each group will qualify for the quarter-finals. The bottom finishers of each group will qualify for the Relegation Play-off.

Group A

Round 1:
 St. Patrick's 1-10, 1-10 Geraldines, Dowdallshill, 16/8/2020,

Round 2:
 Geraldines 2-11, 2-11 O'Raghallaighs, Darver, 25/8/2020,

Round 3:
 St. Patrick's 2-14, 1-10 O'Raghallaighs, Darver, 30/8/2020,

Group B

Round 1:
 Dreadnots 0-16, 1-13 St. Mochta's, Dunleer, 16/8/2020,

Round 2:
 Naomh Máirtín 2-15, 0-07 Dreadnots, Darver, 23/8/2020,

Round 3:
 Naomh Máirtín 1-13, 1-11 St. Mochta's, Darver, 30/8/2020,

Group C

Round 1:
 Dundalk Gaels 0-17, 0-09 O'Connells, Ardee, 16/8/2020,

Round 2:
 St. Joseph's 2-09, 2-06 Dundalk Gaels, Darver, 23/8/2020,

Round 3:
 St. Joseph's 0-13, 0-10 O'Connells, Darver, 30/8/2020,

Group D

Round 1:
 Newtown Blues 2-12, 2-10 Mattock Rangers, Drogheda Park, 16/8/2020,

Round 2:
 Ardee St. Mary's 1-12, 0-14 Newtown Blues, Darver, 23/8/2020,

Round 3:
 Ardee St. Mary's 4-15, 0-20 Mattock Rangers, Darver, 30/8/2020,

Knock-out stages

Relegation play-off

The four bottom finishers from each group qualifed for the Relegation Play-Off. The team to lose both matches were relegated to the 2021 I.F.C.

Finals Newtown Blues1-27 Dundalk Gales 0-18

Quarter-finals 
The winners and runners up of each group qualify for the quarter finals.

Semi-finals

Final

References

Louth SFC
Louth Senior Football Championship
Louth Senior Football Championship